The Judo competition at the 1988 Summer Olympics continued the seven weight classes first used at the 1980 Games. The open division was eliminated from the competition. Women's judo made its first appearance at the Olympic Games, as a demonstration sport. Japan failed to claim the top of the medal count for the first time in an Olympics in which they participated, coming in third behind South Korea and Poland.

Peter Seisenbacher from Austria and Hitoshi Saito from Japan won the gold medal in their weight classes, defending their titles from 1984, and becoming the first judoka to win gold at two Olympics.

Medal summary

Participating nations

Medal table

Women's demonstration events
Women's judo made its first appearance at the Olympic Games, as a demonstration sport. The following were the results of the women's competition. Women's Judo became an official part of the Olympic games from the 1992 Barcelona games and has been an integral part of the games since.

References

External links
 
 
 Sports123.com
 Videos of the 1988 Judo Summer Olympics

 
1988 Summer Olympics events
O
1988
Judo competitions in South Korea